The Imlaydale Historic District is a  historic district primarily in Washington Township of Warren County, New Jersey. It was added to the National Register of Historic Places on March 27, 1991 for its significance in architecture, community development, industry, politics/government, and transportation. The listing includes 12 contributing buildings, four contributing structures, and two contributing sites.

History and description
The district includes essentially all of the village of Imlaydale in the Musconetcong River valley of southern Warren County. It includes Imlaydale Road and surrounding land between NJ 31 and the Musconetcong River, in Hampton borough and the townships of Washington and Lebanon.

The Valley Presbyterian Church Parsonage was built  on land then owned by Noah Cramer. It features Gothic Revival architecture with Italianate influences.

Gallery

See also
 National Register of Historic Places listings in Hunterdon County, New Jersey
 National Register of Historic Places listings in Warren County, New Jersey

References

External links
 

Hampton, New Jersey
Lebanon Township, New Jersey
Washington Township, Warren County, New Jersey
Historic districts on the National Register of Historic Places in New Jersey
National Register of Historic Places in Hunterdon County, New Jersey
National Register of Historic Places in Warren County, New Jersey
New Jersey Register of Historic Places
Federal architecture in New Jersey
Gothic Revival architecture in New Jersey
Italianate architecture in New Jersey